Congenital smooth muscle hamartoma is typically a skin colored or lightly pigmented patch or plaque with hypertrichosis.

See also
 Skin lesion
 List of cutaneous conditions

References 

Cutaneous congenital anomalies